The Männliflue is a mountain of the Bernese Alps, located near Adelboden in the Bernese Oberland, A state of Switzerland. It lies between the valleys of Diemtigen and Adelboden.

References

External links
 Männliflue on Hikr

Mountains of the Alps
Mountains of Switzerland
Mountains of the canton of Bern
Two-thousanders of Switzerland